The 1963 New Jersey State Senate elections were held on November 5.

The elections took place midway through the first term of Governor Richard J. Hughes. Eleven of New Jersey's 21 counties elected Senators; Republicans gained four seats.

Incumbents not running for re-election

Democratic 
Donal C. Fox (Essex) (lost support of county organization)

Republican 
All five Republican incumbents stood for re-election.

Summary of results by county

Close races 
Seats where the margin of victory was under 10%:

  gain
  gain
 
  gain

Seats where the margin of victory was 10% or greater; and the seat flipped party control:

  gain

Burlington

Democratic primary 
Incumbent Senator Henry S. Haines was defeated in the primary election by Edward Hulse, brother-in-law of Governor Hughes.

General election

Camden

Cape May

Essex

Gloucester

Middlesex

Monmouth

Salem

Somerset

Union

Warren

References 

New Jersey State Senate elections
New Jersey State Senate